The Match (also titled The Beautiful Game) is a 1999 British romantic comedy film written and directed by Mick Davis.

Plot summary
In the Scottish village of Inverdoune, teams representing the village's two pubs—Benny's Bar and Le Bistro—have played an annual football game for 99 consecutive years. Under the terms of the original bet, the loser of the 100th match must forfeit their bar to the winner. Facing its 100th consecutive loss, Benny's Bar looks set to be bulldozed and replaced with a car park by the odious owner of Le Bistro, "Gorgeous" George Gus (Richard E. Grant). Local boy Wullie Smith (Max Beesley) returns from university, where he stays at the home of Sheila Bailey, re-igniting his dormant feelings for her daughter Rosemary (Laura Fraser). Wullie possesses TFR (Total Football Recall)—an encyclopedic recollection of football tactics and statistics—and would be an ideal manager for the Benny's Bar team, but he is traumatised by the death of his brother during their childhood and refuses. Also unwilling to help the team is a resident former professional football player (Neil Morrissey), known as "Piss-Off" due to his response whenever he is asked to play.

Cast
 Max Beesley as Wullie Smith
 Isla Blair as Sheila Bailey
 James Cosmo as Billy Bailey
 Laura Fraser as Rosemary Bailey
 Richard E. Grant as Gorgeous Gus
 David Hayman as Scrapper
 Ian Holm as "Big Tam"
 Neil Morrissey as "Piss-Off"
 Tom Sizemore as "Buffalo"
 Samantha Fox as Patsy

Production
The Match was filmed in the Scottish village of Straiton in South Ayrshire.

One of the film's production companies was Irish DreamTime, owned by actor Pierce Brosnan who appears in a cameo role in the film as John MacGhee. Footballer Alan Shearer also makes a cameo appearance.

References

External links

1999 films
British romantic comedy films
1999 romantic comedy films
Films set in Scotland
Films shot in Scotland
British association football films
British sports comedy films
PolyGram Filmed Entertainment films
Films scored by Harry Gregson-Williams
1990s sports comedy films
1990s English-language films
1990s British films